Zacharias Martin Aagaard (13 October 1863 – 6 December 1913) was a Norwegian painter who specialized in marine painting.

Early life
Zackarias Martini Aagaard was born in Levanger in Nord-Trøndelag county, Norway. He was educated at Trondheim Technical  School and  the Royal Drawing School (now Norwegian National Academy of Craft and Art Industry) in Oslo. He was a student of Harriet Backer and Knud Bergslien, and he apprenticed for a time with Christian Krohg.   He spent time researching locations in Lofoten and Finnmark.

He exhibited his works from 1898 in Bergen. He exhibited at the Exposition Universelle (1900).  Several of his paintings were executed in large dimensions.  In 1909, Aagaard was in Trondheim, where he painted a large painting from the harbor featuring pleasure crafts. His work is on public display at the Bergen Maritime Museum, Nordmøre Museum, and Trondheim Maritime Museum among other locations.

He died during 1913 at Kristiania, Norway

Works
In recent years, Aagaard's work has sold at auction between $438USD for 'Ångare', and $11,929USD for 'Norske Båter Langs Kysten'.

Gallery

References

External links
Zackarais Martin Aagaard   (artnet.com)

1863 births
1913 deaths
People from Levanger
Norwegian marine artists
19th-century Norwegian painters
20th-century Norwegian painters
Norwegian male painters
20th-century Norwegian male artists
19th-century Norwegian male artists